Calgary East was a federal electoral district in Alberta, Canada, that was represented in the House of Commons of Canada from 1917 to 1953, 1979 to 1988, from 1997 to 2015. It was a lower income urban riding in Calgary, with a sizable visible minority population.

History
This riding was originally created in 1914 as East Calgary from the electoral districts of Calgary and Macleod. The riding's name was changed in 1924 to Calgary East.

It was abolished in 1952 when its territory was redistributed between Calgary North, Calgary South, and Macleod, with a small section going to Bow River.

It was re-created in 1976 from parts of Calgary North, Calgary South, and Palliser ridings.

It was again abolished in 1987 when its territory was redistributed between Calgary Centre, Calgary Northeast, Calgary Southeast, Calgary Southwest, and Crowfoot ridings.

This electoral district was again created in 1996 from the ridings of Calgary Centre, Calgary Northeast, Calgary Southeast, and Wild Rose.

In 2013, Calgary East was abolished a third time. Most of the riding became part of Calgary Forest Lawn, with smaller portions transferred to Calgary Shepard and Calgary Centre.

Members of Parliament
This riding has elected the following Members of Parliament:

Election results

Calgary East, 1997 - present

Total number of votes:	 		

Note: Conservative vote is compared to total of Canadian Alliance and Progressive Conservative vote in 2000.

Note: Canadian Alliance vote is compared to Reform vote in 1997.

Calgary East, 1979 - 1988

Calgary East, 1925 - 1952

Note: Progressive Conservative vote is compared to National Government vote in 1940.

Note: National Government vote is compared to Conservative vote in 1940.

East Calgary, 1917 - 1925

See also
 List of Canadian federal electoral districts
 Past Canadian electoral districts

References

 
 
 
  Expenditures - 2008
 Expenditures - 2004
 Expenditures - 2000
 Expenditures - 1997
 Elections Canada
 Website of the Parliament of Canada

Notes

Former federal electoral districts of Alberta
Politics of Calgary